Ripon Nath is a Bangladeshi audio engineer. He won Bangladesh National Film Award for Best Sound Recording four times for the films Chorabali  (2012), Aynabaji (2016), Dhaka Attack (2017) and Fagun Haway (2019).

Biography
Nath worked in Asiatic Dhonichitro about ten years. His first work was in a documentary film of Amitabh Reza. His first work in television commercial was also with Amitabh Reza, a television commercial of Sunsilk.

Nath's first work in silver screen was in Bachelor. Besides Bangladeshi film he also worked Indian film Sitara.

Nath won National Film Awards 2012 for Best Sound Recording for Chorabali. He also won National Film Awards 2016 for Best Sound Recording for Aynabaji. Then, he won National Film Awards 2017 for best sound recording for Dhaka Attack. He also awarded in SAARC Film Festival 2019 for Best Sound Design for Fagun Haway in Colombo.

Selected filmography

Awards and nominations

References

External links

Living people
Year of birth missing (living people)
Best Sound Recording National Film Award (Bangladesh) winners
Bangladeshi audio engineers